The St. Ignace News is a weekly newspaper that covers events in and around St. Ignace and Mackinac County in the U.S. state of Michigan.  The newspaper's coverage area includes a substantial portion of the eastern Upper Peninsula of Michigan, including the Les Cheneaux Islands summer resort area northeast of St. Ignace.   

The St. Ignace News is owned by the family of Wesley H. Maurer Jr.

External links
St. Ignace News web page

Newspapers published in Michigan